Donegal on Sunday was a local tabloid newspaper published in County Donegal, Ireland. It launched in March 2004 as an edition of the Sunday Journal, published by the Derry Journal. Originally called the Sunday Democrat, it was based in Letterkenny. It was part of the only local paper in Ireland to be published on a Sunday with a circulation of 6,691 in 2007.  Both the Donegal Democrat and the Donegal People's Press are sister papers of Donegal on Sunday through Derry Journal Newspapers, a holding company of Johnston Press.

By 2012, sales had fallen to 3,547 copies per issue, and the newspaper was closed.

References

2004 establishments in Ireland
2012 disestablishments in Ireland
Derry Journal Newspapers
Mass media in Letterkenny
Newspapers published in the Republic of Ireland
Newspapers established in 2004
Publications disestablished in 2012
Sunday newspapers published in Ireland